The Mindoro State University (MinSU) or (Mindoro SU), formerly Mindoro State College of Agriculture and Technology is a public state higher education institution in Oriental Mindoro, Philippines. It is mandated to provide higher vocational, professional and technical instruction and training in agricultural, fisheries and industrial fields. It is also mandated to promote research, advanced studies and progressive leadership in the fields of agriculture including agricultural education and home technology, with special emphasis given to agricultural industry, fishery, forestry, and industrial education.  Its main campus is located in the municipality of Victoria.

History

The Mindoro State University (MinSu) was originally the Mindoro National Agricultural School (MINAS) created by R.A. 506 as a national agricultural secondary public school in the island of Mindoro. It formally opened its doors for learning on August 26, 1951.

In 1963, by authority of R.A. 3758, it opened the Collegiate Department. This steered the offering of several collegiate courses. The first two years leading to the degree of Bachelor of Science in agriculture (BSA) was initially offered. This was followed by the two-year course leading to Associate in Agricultural Technology (AAT) in 1973, then the complete course offering of Bachelor of Science in Agricultural Education (BSAE) in 1975 and the BSA curriculum developed by the Technical Panel for Agricultural Education (TPAE) based at Los Baños, Laguna was adopted by the school. This gradually replaced the BSA curriculum as well as the BSAE.

The continued offering of Collegiate courses, in addition to the secondary curriculum which was offered since the founding of the school made MINAS a full-fledged college hence; the change of name from MINAS to MCAT was approved on June 10, 1976, by then Secretary Juan L. Manuel of the Department of Education, Culture and Sports. It was converted in State University and is now MinSu by virtue of R.A. 8007 on May 25, 1995. Virgilio C. Juan became the principal of the Victoria campus and is a well-known parliamentarian and  author. His work on parliamentary procedure was circulated in the different parts of Philippines and became the basis for regional competition on parliamentary procedure. Having a curriculum patterned from UP Los Banos, students can easily transferred to UPLB after two years if they had able to maintain good scholastic standing.

Campuses

Bongabong Campus
Labasan, Bongabong
Originally the Bongabong School of Fisheries (BSF), established on September 21, 1964, by virtue of R.A. 3306. IN 1975, the government approved the offering of the Revised Fishery Technical Education Curriculum. It was converted into a full-fledged college as the Bongabong College of Fisheries (BCF) on July 15, 1995, by virtue of R.A. 8143.

The current Campus Director is Dr. Ciedelle P. Salazar.

Calapan City Campus
Masipit, Calapan City
Established as a public secondary trade school known as Calapan School of Arts and Trades (CSAT) by virtue of R.A. 3397 in June 1961 but only started operating five years later. In 1972, CSAT merited the approval of Ministry of Education, Culture and Sports (MECS) to offer trade Technical Education Curriculum. Efforts to convert CSAT into a higher education authorized to offer degree courses were realized with the approval of R.A. 8076 on June 19, 1995, converting CSAT to Polytechnic College of Calapan (PCC). With the integration, then PCC has evolved as MinSu Mindoro State University.

The current Campus Director is Dr. Ma. Arlyn M. Redublo.

Courses offered

Victoria Main Campus

Ed. D. major in Educational Management
Ph. D. in Crop Science
Master of Arts in Education
Major in:
Education Management
English
Guidance and Counseling
Filipino
Biological Science
Mathematics
Master of Science in Agriculture
Major in:
Animal Science
Crop Science
Master in Public Administration
Master in Business Administration
Master in Management
Bachelor of Science in Agriculture
Major in:
Crop Science
Animal Science
Bachelor of Science in Eco-Tourism Management
Bachelor of Science in Agro-forestry
Bachelor of Science in Environmental Science
Bachelor of Science in Horticulture
Bachelor of Science in Entrepreneurship
Bachelor in Secondary Education
Major in:
Biological Science
Filipino
English
Mathematics
Bachelor in Elementary Education
Bachelor of Arts in English Language
Bachelor of Science in Agricultural Engineering
Bachelor of Science in Information Technology

Bongabong Campus

Ed. D. major in Educational Management
Master of Arts in Education
Major in:
Education Management
English
Filipino
Biological Science
Mathematics
Master in Management
Bachelor of Science in Fisheries
Major in Aquaculture
Bachelor of Science in Computer Engineering
Bachelor of Science in Hotel and Restaurant Management
Bachelor of Arts in Political Science
Bachelor of Science in Criminology
Bachelor of Secondary Education
Major in:
Biological Science
Technology Education
English
Mathematics
Bachelor in Elementary Education
Bachelor of Science in Information Technology
Housekeeping NC II
Food and Beverage Services NC II

Calapan City Campus
Ed. D. major in Educational Management
Ph. D. in Crop Science
Master of Arts in Education
Major in:
Education Management
English
Guidance and Counseling
Filipino
Biological Science
Mathematics
Master of Science in Agriculture
Major in:
Animal Science
Crop Science
Master in Public Administration
Master in Business Administration
Bachelor of Arts 
Major in:
Psychology
English Language
Bachelor of Science in Criminology
Bachelor of Science in Hotel and Restaurant Management
Bachelor of Science in Information Technology
Bachelor of Technical Teacher Education
Major in:
Automotive Technology
Electrical Technology
Drafting Technology
Electronics Technology
Food Service Management
Garments Technology
Bachelor in Secondary Education
Major in:
English
Mathematics
Science
Technology Education

References

State universities and colleges in the Philippines
Universities and colleges in Oriental Mindoro